Saulnot is a commune in the Haute-Saône department in the region of Bourgogne-Franche-Comté in eastern France.

Coal mines operated in the village between the 16th century and 1925.

See also
Communes of the Haute-Saône department

References

Communes of Haute-Saône